RhoD (Ras homolog gene family, member D) is a small (~21 kDa) signaling G protein (more specifically a GTPase), and is a member of the Rac subfamily of the family Rho family of GTPases. It is encoded by the gene RHOD.

It binds GTP and is involved in endosome dynamics and reorganization of the actin cytoskeleton, and it may coordinate membrane transport with the function of the cytoskeleton.

Interactions 

RhoD has been shown to interact with CNKSR1 and DIAPH2.

References

Further reading